HSBC Bank Egypt SAE is a multinational bank in Egypt, providing a wide range of banking and related financial services through a network of 100 branches and 20 mini bank units in Cairo, Alexandria, Sharm El Sheikh, Hurghada, Borg El Arab and 6th of October City.

History
HSBC Bank Egypt was established in 1982 as Hongkong Egyptian Bank with 40% HSBC ownership. In January 1994, the bank was renamed Egyptian British Bank under the same shareholding structure. The bank took the name HSBC Bank Egypt in April 2001 following an increase in shareholding by the HSBC Group's from 40% to 94.5% of its issued share capital.

In 2001, 2003 and 2005, The Banker magazine named it "Bank of the Year" in Egypt.

See also

HSBC Bank Middle East Limited
HSBC Holdings plc

External links
 HSBC Bank Egypt website

Egypt
Banks of Egypt
Banks established in 1982
Companies based in Cairo
Egyptian companies established in 1982